Mesodiphlebia is a genus of snout moths described by Philipp Christoph Zeller in 1881.

Species
Mesodiphlebia crassivenia Zeller, 1881
Mesodiphlebia ochraceella Hampson, 1918
Mesodiphlebia stricticostella Ragonot, 1887

References

Anerastiini
Pyralidae genera